The TVB Anniversary Award for Most Improved Male Artiste is one of the TVB Anniversary Awards presented annually by Television Broadcasts Limited (TVB) to recognize a male artiste who has delivered improving performances in Hong Kong television dramas or variety shows throughout the designated year.

The Most Improved Award was first introduced in 1998. It was separated into two categories—Most Improved On-screen Performance Award—Drama (螢幕大躍進獎—戲劇組) and Most Improved On-screen Performance Award—Non-drama (螢幕大躍進獎—非戲劇組), to individually recognize actors and variety presenters. The award was re-established in 2002, changing its name to My Favourite Most Improved Male Artiste of the Year (本年度我最喜愛的飛躍進步男藝員). In 2005, the name was changed to Most Improved Male Artiste (飛躍進步男藝員).

Winners and nominees

1990s

2000s

2010s

2020s

Records

Most nominations

Age superlatives

External links
 Anniversary Awards  myTV SUPER

Most improved awards
TVB Anniversary Awards